Patrocles name may refer to:

Patrocles of Thurii (5th century BC), tragic poet 
Patrocles teacher of rhetoric mentioned by Quintilian
Patrocles (geographer) (c. 312-261 BC), Macedonian general and writer under Seleucus and Antiochus
Noël Patrocles de Thoisy (died 1671), early governor general of the French Antilles
Patrocles, half-brother of Socrates

See also
Patroclus (disambiguation)